Central Coast Mariners Football Club are a football club based in Gosford, on the Central Coast of New South Wales which was founded in 2004. They have had nine managers in their history (including one caretaker), the first being Lawrie McKinna and the current being Nick Montgomery.

All figures are correct as of the match played on 13 January 2023.

Statistics 

 Table headers

 Nationality – If the manager played international football as a player, the country/countries he played for are shown. Otherwise, the manager's nationality is given as their country of birth.
 From – The year of the manager's first game for Central Coast Mariners.
 To – The year of the manager's last game for Central Coast Mariners.
 P – The number of competitive games managed for Central Coast Mariners.
 W – The number of games won as a manager.
 D – The number of games draw as a manager.
 L – The number of games lost as a manager.
 GF – The number of goals scored under his management.
 GA – The number of goals conceded under his management.
 GD –  The goal difference under his management
 Win% – The total winning percentage under his management.
 Honours – The trophies won while managing Central Coast Mariners.

Note: Games included are A-League Men (including finals and Pre-Season Cup), Australia Cup, AFC Champions League and Oceania Club Championship Qualification. Friendlies are not included.

Source:

References 

Central Coast Mariners FC